USS Newport News (SSN-750), a , is the third ship of the United States Navy to be named for Newport News, Virginia. The contract to build her was awarded to Newport News Shipbuilding and Dry Dock Company in Newport News, Virginia on 19 April 1982 and her keel was laid down on 3 March 1984. She was launched on 15 March 1986 sponsored by Mrs. Rosemary D. Trible, and commissioned on 3 June 1989. Mayor Jessie M. Rattley presented the ship with a commemorative plaque containing the poem "Newport News," written by Newport News native Ronald W. Bell, whose poem "Admiral Rickover" also appears upon a plaque aboard the Los Angeles-class submarine .

Collision with Japanese ship
On 8 January 2007, Newport News was operating submerged in the Arabian Sea south of the Straits of Hormuz when the submarine hit Japanese tanker Mogamigawa. She had been operating as part of Carrier Strike Group 8 (CSG-8), organized around the aircraft carrier . The Carrier Strike Group was redeploying to the Indian Ocean to support a maritime cordon during the war in Somalia when the incident happened. Newport News suffered damage to her bow, but there was no damage to the sail, mast or reactor, and she made for port in Bahrain under her own power.
Newport News was escorted from the mouth of the Straits of Hormuz to Bahrain by the Guided Missile Destroyer . This was due to the fact that the submarine was unable to transit submerged and has no surface defense capabilities. During the transit, Iranian aircraft and warships shadowed the ships.
An official of the Kawasaki Kisen Company (or K Line), which owns the tanker, announced that
Mogamigawas hull and propellers were damaged.

According to a Navy spokesman, the collision occurred as a result of the venturi effect. The tanker passed over the area where the submarine was submerged and this created a sucking effect that forced the submarine upward to the surface.
The incident was the third collision between a US nuclear-powered submarine and a Japanese civilian ship.

On 29 January, after the boat returned to Bahrain for repairs, administrative personnel actions, also known as Admiral's Masts, were taken against several members of her crew, which included relieving the boat's commanding officer of command due to a lack of confidence in his ability to command.

On 10 April the Iranian Fars News Agency reported that Newport News has been leaking radioactive and chemical pollution into the Persian Gulf and claimed that following this formal complaint, the ship departed the gulf for a complete overhaul.
The US Navy Fifth Fleet denied this claim restating that damage was limited to the bow and that the sail, mast and reactors were not damaged. On 2 October 2007 the US Navy agreed to pay Kawasaki Kisen Kaisha Ltd, the company that owns Mogamigawa an undisclosed amount in compensation for the collision.

Gallery

References

External links

US Navy Commander Submarine Group Two

Los Angeles-class submarines
Cold War submarines of the United States
Nuclear submarines of the United States Navy
United States submarine accidents
Maritime incidents in 2007
Japan–United States relations
Non-combat naval accidents
International maritime incidents
Ships built in Newport News, Virginia
1986 ships
Submarines of the United States